Sabine Belkofer (also known as Sabine Belkofer-Kröhnert, Belkofer-Krehnert; born 27 November 1967) is a former German curler and curling coach.

She competed at the 2002 Winter Olympics, finishing in 5th place.

She works as a business manager at the Hamburg Curling Club.

Teams

Record as a coach of national teams

References

External links

Rechtsanwälte Schulze Hamurg - Unser Team

Living people
1967 births
German female curlers
Curlers at the 2002 Winter Olympics
Olympic curlers of Germany
German curling coaches